Sarajevo International Airport  is the main international airport in Bosnia and Herzegovina, serving Sarajevo, capital of Bosnia and Herzegovina. In 2019, 1,143,680 passengers travelled through the airport, compared to 323,499 in 2001.

History

Early years
First regular flights to Sarajevo using an airfield in the suburb of Butmir begin in 1930 when the domestic airliner Aeroput opened a regular route linking Belgrade to Podgorica via Sarajevo. A year later, Aeroput opened a new route which linked Belgrade and Zagreb via Sarajevo, Split, and Rijeka. In 1935, Aeroput operated three times weekly the non-stop route Belgrade – Sarajevo, which was extended to Dubrovnik a year later. In 1937, Aeroput included regular flights linking Sarajevo to Zagreb, and 1938 was the year when first international flights were introduced when Aeroput extended the route Dubrovnik – Sarajevo – Zagreb to Vienna, Brno, and Prague.

The airfield in Butmir remained in use all the way until 1969. The need for a new airport in Sarajevo, with an asphalt-concrete runway, was acknowledged in the mid-1960s when JAT, Yugoslav national carrier at that time, began acquiring jet planes. The construction of the airport began in 1966 at its present location, not far from the old one.

Sarajevo Airport opened on 2 June 1969 for domestic traffic. In 1970, Frankfurt became the first international destination served. Most of the time the airport was a 'feeder' airport where passengers embarked for flights to Zagreb and Belgrade on their way to international destinations. Over time, the traffic volume steadily grew from 70,000 to 600,000 passengers a year. The first renovation came for the 1984 Winter Olympics, when the runway was extended by 200 meters, the navigation system was improved, and a new terminal building was built, designed for 1 million passengers a year.

At the beginning of the Bosnian War, the airport was put under control of the Yugoslav People's Army (JNA). When the regular flights were stopped, the JNA evacuated some 30,000 people, mostly women and children, who were spouses and children of JNA officers fleeing the siege of Sarajevo; the first humanitarian aid from the US and France arrived in this period too. After JNA left, the airport was for a while under control of Bosnian Serb forces and in June 1992, they handed over the airport to the UN to use it for humanitarian purposes (United Nations Security Council Resolution 757). In the biggest humanitarian operation in history of the UN that followed, during the Bosnian war, some 13,000 flights were carried out and over 160,000 tons of international humanitarian aid was delivered to the besieged city of Sarajevo.

The airport re-opened to civilian air traffic on 16 August 1996 and has since been renovated and slowly restored. Since the Dayton Agreement in 1995, the airport has a commercial flight business which includes Austrian Airlines, Lufthansa, Air Serbia, Croatia Airlines, Turkish Airlines, and others.

Development in the 2000s
On 18 October 2005, Paddy Ashdown, the High Representative of Bosnia and Herzegovina, suspended a decision by Bosnian authorities to name the airport after Alija Izetbegović, the first President of Bosnia and Herzegovina. The High Representative stated that such a renaming might undermine the reconciliation process by alienating non-Bosniak citizens. In 2005, the European branch of the Airports Council International awarded Sarajevo the award of Best Airport Under 1 Million Passengers.

In 2013, Sarajevo International Airport had 665,638 passengers which is more than all of the other airports in Bosnia and Herzegovina had together and a 14.7% increase from 2012, this is the highest number of passengers per year since the reopening of the airport. On 26 December 2014, the airport welcomed its 700,000th passenger on Austrian Airlines flight OS758 to Vienna.

In May 2015, work has started on expansion of Sarajevo International Airport. Current work is undergoing on expansion of arrival area, adding more passport control check stands and rearranging whole arrival area to make it more passenger friendly. Next to follow is expansion of check in area which will include three more check in counters making it total of 15 check in counters. By the end of the year the airport will begin with platform expansion and the construction of rapid exit taxiway with scheduled completion by mid of the next year. 2017 should be the year in which airport will enter into the reconstruction of the runway and the maneuvering areas. Expansion of the airport at the current level is financed by Sarajevo Airport own funds. On 6 June 2015, Pope Francis visited Sarajevo arriving on an Alitalia Airbus A320-200 from Rome. Welcome ceremony was held at Sarajevo International Airport.

The airport served as the home base for the country's flag carrier, B&H Airlines, until July 2015 when the airline ceased operations. During December 2015, Sarajevo Airport experienced very low visibility and fog. About 40% of flights were canceled which impacted passengers growth and financial loss to the airport. Airport handled only 28,167 passengers of 50,000 planned (last year in December 43,079 passengers were handled). For Sarajevo International Airport one of major restrictions is a mountain terrain that requires a high approach precision and a big inclination angle in a procedure of unsuccessful approach and landing. Vlado Jurić, Head of the Office for aviation safety at Bosnia and Herzegovina Air Navigation Services Agency (BHANSA), presented the information about problems caused by reduced minimums at Sarajevo Airport. For the implementation of ILS categories (CAT II or CAT III), the terrain in front of the runway start should be free of obstacles for at least 1,000 metres. It means that the RWY 12 threshold should be moved for additional 200 metres which would reduce the runway length and as such is unacceptable. From the point of view of procedure design, the reduction of minimums is not an option and therefore it is necessary to find other solutions for improvement of landing conditions at Sarajevo Airport. The biggest problem at Sarajevo Airport is fog. The representative of Sarajevo Airport, Mr Nermin Zijadić informed that there is a relevant plan regarding this problem. He also presented the information about future projects of Sarajevo Airport among which the most important one is a reconstruction of the runway including its lighting system.

In 2016, Qatar Airways announced a new route from Doha to Sarajevo. However, the start of this service was first postponed and then moved to 10 October 2017. with four weekly flights. On 5 December 2016, the airport welcomed its 800,000th passenger on Air Serbia flight JU113 to Belgrade.

In 2017, Sarajevo International Airport welcomed six new airlines and seven destinations: AtlasGlobal (Istanbul), Wizz Air (Budapest), Wataniya Airways (Kuwait City), Nesma Airlines (Riyadh), TUI fly Belgium (Charleroi), flydubai (Dubai), Qatar Airways (Doha).

On 28 November 2017, Sarajevo International Airport received its 900,000 passenger of the year, representing a record number of passengers in one calendar year. On 5 December 2018, Sarajevo International Airport has welcomed for first time its 1,000,000 passenger of the year.

On 3 May 2017, the airport announced a major terminal expansion. The project is worth 20 million Euros and scheduled to be completed in 2020. A new, 10,000 sqm building on four levels will be built as an addition to the current terminal building. The new terminal will have capacity to handle 2 million passengers per year and will be equipped with three jet bridges. On 9 April 2019, the airport announced expansion of the VIP area into a new VIP building as part of the expansion project for the new main terminal with a separate check-in, customs and arrival section for VIP travellers. During June–July 2019, Sarajevo Airport has seen its largest destination expansion. Total of 10 new destinations have been added. FlyBosnia started flights from Sarajevo to Riyadh, Kuwait, Jeddah, Gassim and Bahrain. Flynas started flights from Riyadh and Jeddah. Norwegian started flights from Göteborg and Eurowings started flights from Berlin Tegel Airport. In October and November 2019, FlyBosnia started flights to London Luton and Rome Fiumicino Airport.

2020s
On 17 November 2020, Sarajevo International Airport terminated its contract with FlyBosnia after the company failed to repay its debts within 60 days.

On 3 February 2021, Wizz Air announced the opening of its second base in Bosnia and Herzegovina, after Tuzla; the airline will open a base at Sarajevo with one Airbus A320. The airline announced nine new European destinations from Sarajevo with 21 weekly departures. On 12 August 2021, Wizz Air has subsequently announced that it will base its second aircraft at Sarajevo International Airport. It is planned to launch 7 new routes from December 2021. Also, Wizz Air Abu Dhabi plans to introduce direct routes between Sarajevo and Abu Dhabi in October 2021. However in September 2022, Wizz Air announced it would close its base at the airport, ending all routes except those to London and Abu Dhabi.

Airlines and destinations

Passenger

The following airlines operate regular scheduled and charter flights at Sarajevo International Airport:

Cargo

Statistics

Traffic figures

Passengers, cargo and movements

Access

By car
Sarajevo Airport is connected to the Sarajevo–Zenica–Mostar highway (A1) via nearby Stup Interchange and Brijesce Interchange.

By bus
Centrotrans Eurolines, in cooperation with Sarajevo International Airport, provide a bus service Airport – Baščaršija City Center – Airport. The bus stand is just outside of the arrivals area in the main terminal. The price of a one-way ticket is €2.50. WiFi internet is available on board.

By trolleybus
The airport is connected with Sarajevo's city center with trolleybus number 103, operated by the GRAS transport company.

Accidents and incidents
 18 January 1977: Džemal Bijedić, then prime minister of Yugoslavia, and his wife were among the eight people killed when their Learjet 25 crashed on the Inač mountain near Kreševo, Bosnia and Herzegovina. The plane took off from Batajnica Air Base in Belgrade and was en route to Sarajevo when it crashed, ostensibly due to poor weather conditions. Conspiracy theorists have suggested that the crash was not an accident but rather the result of foul play at the hands of his Serbian rivals.
 31 December 1994: A Belair Ilyushin-76TD cargo plane, registration EW-76836 was operating on a flight from Luxembourg to Sarajevo on behalf of the United Nations. At the time of landing at Sarajevo airport, the runway was flooded and the aircraft overran the runway and struck a ditch with the nose gear. There were no fatalities in the crash landing, but the aircraft was damaged beyond repair.
 23 December 2001: A Crossair Avro RJ, registration HB-IXH, skidded 100 meters off the runway when it tried to land at Sarajevo airport under snowy conditions. Nobody was injured in the accident, nor was there any damage. By next Monday afternoon, the aircraft had been recovered and was parked on the apron. The French Air Detachment (DETAIR) and local aeronautical authorities have opened an investigation to determine the cause of the accident. It was snowing on the afternoon of 23 December. The airport snow plough had just cleared the runway, a 20-minute job, when an HB-IXH from Zürich requested authorization to land.

See also
 List of airports in Bosnia and Herzegovina
 Tuzla International Airport
 Mostar International Airport
 Banja Luka International Airport

References

External links

 Official website
 Sarajevo International Airport upgrade 2010
 
 

Airports in Bosnia and Herzegovina
Airports established in 1969
Transport in Sarajevo
Grad Sarajevo
Ilidža
1969 establishments in Yugoslavia